Trachipterus fukuzakii, the tapertail ribbonfish, is a species of ray-finned fish within the family Trachipteridae, found in the Eastern Pacific Ocean from southern California to northern Peru. It is an epilagic to mesopelagic species, being found in open oceans at depths of 500 meters. It grows at lengths of 107.1 to 143 centimeters long. It has been classified as a 'Least concern' species by the IUCN Red List, as it has a large distribution and no known major threats.

References 

IUCN Red List least concern species
Fish described in 1964
Fish of the Pacific Ocean
Fish of Peru
Fish of Central America
Fish of the United States
Fish of Colombia
Fish of Ecuador
Trachipteridae